Vempalle is a town located in Andhra Pradesh, India. It is the headquarters of Vempalle Mandal, Kadapa district. It occupies an area of about 10 square kilometres along the banks of the Papagni river.

Geography
It has an average elevation of 201 meters (662 feet).

Demographics 

It has a population of about 20000 and a major Gramapanchayathi population of about 40000 people.

References 

Villages in Kadapa district